Serbia participated in the Eurovision Song Contest 2022 in Turin, Italy, with "" performed by Konstrakta. The Serbian national broadcaster Radio Television of Serbia (RTS) organised the national final  '22 in order to select the Serbian entry for the 2022 contest.
It was the first entry in the Eurovision Song Contest to contain a verse in Latin.

Background 

Serbia's , "" performed by Hurricane, qualified to the final and placed fifteenth.

The Serbian national broadcaster, Radio Television of Serbia (RTS), broadcasts the event within Serbia and organises the selection process for the nation's entry. Between 2007 and 2009, Serbia used the  national final in order to select their entry. However, after their  entry, "" performed by Marko Kon and Milaan, failed to qualify Serbia to the final, the broadcaster shifted their selection strategy to selecting specific composers to create songs for artists. In , RTS selected Goran Bregović to compose songs for a national final featuring three artists, while in  Kornelije Kovač, Aleksandra Kovač and Kristina Kovač were tasked with composing one song each. In , the internal selection of Željko Joksimović and the song "" secured the country's second highest placing in the contest to this point, placing third. In , RTS returned to an open national final format and organized the  competition. The winning entry, "" performed by Moje 3, failed to qualify Serbia to the final. In , RTS selected Vladimir Graić, the composer of Serbia's 2007 winning entry "", to compose songs for a national final featuring three artists. Their song "" was also internally selected and qualified the country to the final.

Before Eurovision

Pesma za Evroviziju '22 

 '22 was the national final organised by RTS in order to select the Serbian entry for the Eurovision Song Contest 2022. The selection consisted of two semi-finals held on 3 and 4 March 2022, respectively, and a final on 5 March 2022. The three shows were broadcast on RTS1 and RTS Planeta as well as streamed online via the broadcaster's website rts.rs.

Competing entries 
Artists and songwriters were able to submit their entries between 28 September 2021 and 1 December 2021. Artists were required to be Serbian citizens and submit entries in one of the official languages of the Republic of Serbia, while songwriters of any nationality were allowed to submit songs. At the closing of the deadline, 150 submissions were received. A selection committee consisting of RTS music editors reviewed the submissions and selected thirty-six entries to proceed to the national final. The selected competing entries were announced on 14 January 2022 and among the competing artists is Sara Jo, who represented Serbia in the Eurovision Song Contest 2013 as part of the group Moje 3.

On 19 January 2022, Stefan Zdravković (Princ od Vranje) announced his withdrawal from the national final due to conflicts with the songwriter of his song "". The song was instead performed by Tijana Dapčević, who represented Macedonia in the Eurovision Song Contest 2014, under an altered version titled "". On 14 February 2022, RTS announced that Goca Tržan had withdrawn from the national final due to health problems and was replaced with the song "" performed by Chegi and Braća Bluz Band.

Semi-finals  
The semi-finals took place at the Studio 9 of RTS in Košutnjak, Belgrade on 3 and 4 March 2022. In each semi-final eighteen songs competed and the nine qualifiers for the final were decided by a combination of votes from a jury panel consisting of Željko Vasić (singer), Tijana Milošević (violinist), Vojislav Aralica (producer), Tijana Bogićević (represented Serbia in the Eurovision Song Contest 2017) and Biljana Krstić (singer), and the Serbian public via SMS voting. In addition to the competing entries, former Eurovision contestants Hurricane (who represented Serbia in 2020 and 2021) were featured as the guest performers in the first semi-final while former Eurovision contestants Daniel Popović (who represented Yugoslavia in 1983), Bojana Stamenov (who represented Serbia in 2015), Danica Krstić and Mladen Lukić (who represented Serbia in 2018 as part of Balkanika), and singers Đorđe David and Ivana Peters were featured as guest performers in the second semi-final.

Final 
The final took place at the Studio 9 of RTS in Košutnjak, Belgrade on 5 March 2022 and featured the eighteen qualifiers from the preceding two semi-finals. The winner, "" performed by Konstrakta, was decided by a combination of votes from a jury panel consisting of Dragoljub Ilić (composer), Slobodan Marković (composer), Una Senić (music journalist), Vladimir Nikolov (composer) and Neda Ukraden (singer), and the Serbian public via SMS voting. Former Eurovision contestants Jelena Tomašević (who represented Serbia in 2008), Sergej Ćetković (who represented Montenegro in 2014), Knez (who represented Montenegro in 2015), Tijana Bogićević (who represented Serbia in 2017), and singers Lena Kovačević, Kiki Lesendrić, Alen Ademović and Boris Režak were featured as guest performers during the show.

Ratings

OGAE awards

Following the event, the fan organisation OGAE Serbia voted on the best song at  '22 as decided by association members. The award was won by the winning song "" with 256 points. Second place, with 233 points, came from the song "" by Sara Jo, while third place went to Zorja and her song "Zorja" with 143 points. Sara Jo was also the winner of the OGAE Second Chance, which was awarded after a round of voting with all entries, not including the winning song of the event.

Controversies

Vote rigging allegations 
After the final, singer Aca Lukas, who placed 5th in the final with the song "", accused the Serbian public broadcaster RTS of irregularities in the voting of the selection, stating he would file a criminal complaint against the head of RTS, editor of entertainment program  and general director  for "stealing votes". RTS responded, stating that the SMS votes were counted automatically by software which did not allow interference. The Comtrade System Integration company, which set up the software to count the votes, said it was prepared to hand the votes to the authorities if requested to do so, adding that the same data is available from mobile phone operators. He also made comments about the winning performer Konstrakta, saying: "I could have gone on stage and washed my feet, but I chose instead to perform", also claiming she is working for opposition political parties. Konstrakta, laughing off his suggestion, jokingly offered "to wash his feet for him." After the controversy, RTS and Kovačević announced they would sue Lukas.

Promotion 
Konstrakta performed "" at the Israel Calling Eurovision pre-party in Tel Aviv on 7 April 2022, to positive feedback. Due to technical issues, she performed alone on stage and used hotel towels for the performance.

Send-off ceremony 

On April 28, RTS prepared a ceremonial farewell of the Serbian representative to the Eurovision Song Contest 2022. The ceremony was attended by numerous guests, including the Ambassador of Italy to Serbia Carlo Lo Cascio, the editor of the entertainment program Olivera Kovačević and the director of RTS Dragan Bujošević, as well as members of OGAE Serbia, fans of the competition, journalists and others. At the ceremony, the flags of Serbia and the host country were as is tradition given to the representative of Serbia. This year, the Ambassador of Italy to Serbia presented the Italian flag and wished the Serbian representative success in the competition.

At Eurovision 
According to Eurovision rules, all nations with the exceptions of the host country and the "Big Five" (France, Germany, Italy, Spain and the United Kingdom) are required to qualify from one of two semi-finals in order to compete for the final; the top ten countries from each semi-final progress to the final. The European Broadcasting Union (EBU) split up the competing countries into six different pots based on voting patterns from previous contests, with countries with favourable voting histories put into the same pot. On 25 January 2022, an allocation draw was held which placed each country into one of the two semi-finals, as well as which half of the show they would perform in. Serbia has been placed into the second semi-final, to be held on 12 May 2022, and has been scheduled to perform in the first half of the show.

Once all the competing songs for the 2022 contest had been released, the running order for the semi-finals was decided by the shows' producers rather than through another draw, so that similar songs were not placed next to each other.

Voting 
Voting during the three shows involved each country awarding two sets of points from 1-8, 10 and 12: one from their professional jury and the other from televoting. Each nation's jury consisted of five music industry professionals who are citizens of the country they represent, with a diversity in gender and age represented. The judges assess each entry based on the performances during the second Dress Rehearsal of each show, which takes place the night before each live show, against a set of criteria including: vocal capacity; the stage performance; the song's composition and originality; and the overall impression by the act. Jury members may only take part in panel once every three years, and are obliged to confirm that they are not connected to any of the participating acts in a way that would impact their ability to vote impartially. Jury members should also vote independently, with no discussion of their vote permitted with other jury members. The exact composition of the professional jury, and the results of each country's jury and televoting were released after the grand final; the individual results from each jury member were also released in an anonymised form.

Below is a breakdown of points awarded to Serbia and awarded by Serbia in the second semi-final and grand final of the contest, and the breakdown of the jury voting and televoting conducted during the two shows:

Points awarded to Serbia

Points awarded by Serbia

Detailed voting results
The following members comprised the Serbian jury:
 Dušan Alagić
 Jelena Tomašević
 Mari Mari
 Miloš Luka Roganović
 Srđan Marjanović

Notes

References 

2022
Countries in the Eurovision Song Contest 2022
Eurovision